Japanese Korean or Korean Japanese might refer to:
Japan-Korea relations
Japanese Korean Army
Japanese people in North Korea
Japanese people in South Korea
Korea under Japanese rule
Koreans in Japan, including Zainichi Koreans and Japanese citizens of Korean descent
The Zainichi Korean language, a variety of Korean spoken in Japan
a hypothetical language family including Japanese and Korean, or some ancient languages of the Korean peninsula (Japanese–Koguryoic languages)
Comparison of Japanese and Korean